Iraq is a country in Western Asia, bordered by Turkey to the north, Iran to the east, Kuwait to the southeast, Saudi Arabia to the south, Jordan to the southwest, and Syria to the west. Iraq's economy is dominated by the oil sector, which as 2021, provides about 92% of foreign exchange earnings.The lack of development in other sectors has resulted in 13% unemployed  as of 2017 per capita GDP of $7,000. Public sector employment accounted for nearly 60% of full-time employment in 2011. The oil export industry, which dominates the Iraqi economy, generates very little employment. Currently only a modest percentage of women (the highest estimate for 2011 was 22%) participate in the labour force.

Notable firms 
This list includes notable companies with primary headquarters located in the country. The industry and sector follow the Industry Classification Benchmark taxonomy. Organizations which have ceased operations are included and noted as defunct.

See also 
 Economy of Iraq
 List of airlines of Iraq
 List of banks in Iraq

References 

Companies of Iraq
Iraq